Natural Language Engineering is a bimonthly peer-reviewed academic journal published by Cambridge University Press which covers research and software in natural language processing. Its aim is to "bridge the gap between traditional computational linguistics research and the implementation of practical applications with potential real-world use". Other than original publication on theoretical and applied aspects of computational linguistics, the journal also contains Industry Watch and Emerging Trends columns tracking developments in the field. The editor-in-chief is  Ruslan Mitkov from University of Wolverhampton. According to the Journal Citation Reports, the journal has a 2016 impact factor of 1.065.

References

External links

Natural language processing
Computational linguistics journals
Cambridge University Press academic journals
English-language journals
Publications established in 1995